Pathomchai Sueasakul (born October 10, 1988) is a Thai professional footballer who plays as a defensive midfielder for Thai League 1 club Ratchaburi Mitr Phol.

External links

1988 births
Living people
Pathomchai Sueasakul
Pathomchai Sueasakul
Association football midfielders
Pathomchai Sueasakul
Pathomchai Sueasakul
Pathomchai Sueasakul
Pathomchai Sueasakul
Pathomchai Sueasakul